Ronald Reed Garet (born March 17, 1951 in Los Angeles County, California) is an American religion law scholar, currently the Carolyn Craig Franklin Chair in Law and Religion at USC Gould School of Law.  

He graduated from Harvard University, magna cum laude, received his PhD in religious studies from Yale University, and his JD from USC Gould. He is a member of Phi Beta Kappa.

References

1951 births
Living people
University of Southern California faculty
American lawyers
Harvard University alumni
Yale University alumni
USC Gould School of Law alumni
American legal scholars